Michael Holt Newlin (May 16, 1926 – August 9, 2021) was an American diplomat who served as the United States Ambassador to Algeria. A career Foreign Service officer, he was nominated by Ronald Reagan in August 1981, and served from October 28, 1981 until July 21, 1985.  He was also the Representative of the U.S.A. to the Vienna Office of the United Nations from August 12, 1988 until September 6, 1991.

Early life
Born in Greensboro, he lived there until the age of ten or eleven when the family moved to Sanford, North Carolina.  He attended Harvard University, living in Leverett House, majoring in government with a “second in economics.” While attending Harvard he wanted to go see operas but did not have enough money to do so, becoming extras in operas to see them while making some money to pay for tuition. He graduated in 1949 and went on to graduate from the Harvard Business School (M.B.A., 1951).

Career
Newlin was a civilian expert with the Department of the Air Force in 1951-52, leaving to enter the Foreign Service.  He was an economic and consular officer in Frankfurt and political officer in Oslo in 1954-58. Within a week of arriving in Norway he went skiing (for the first time) with his wife Milena and broke his leg. Later positions included foreign affairs officer in the Office of United Nations Political Affairs (1958–63), deputy chief of the political section in Paris/USNATO (1963–67) and in Brussels/USNATO (1967–68), counselor for political affairs at the United States Mission to the United Nations in New York in 1968-72. Deputy Chief of Mission in Kinshasa (1972–75) and principal officer in Jerusalem in 1975-80. In 1980-81 he was Deputy Assistant Secretary of State for International Organization Affairs.

After his term as United States Ambassador to Algeria, Newlin served as Deputy Assistant Secretary of State for Consular Affairs, where, before the Senate and opposed by Kurt Vonnegut, he defended provisions of the Immigration and Nationality Act of 1952 involving good moral character, including denial of visas to aliens prejudicial to the public interest.

References

1926 births
2021 deaths
Harvard College alumni
Harvard Business School alumni
People from Greensboro, North Carolina
People from Sanford, North Carolina
Ambassadors of the United States to Algeria
Representatives of the United States to the United Nations International Organizations in Vienna
American expatriates in West Germany
American expatriates in Norway
American expatriates in France
American expatriates in Belgium
American expatriates in the Democratic Republic of the Congo
American expatriates in Israel
20th-century American diplomats